The Governors of Plantations Act 1698 (11 Will 3 c 12) or "An Act to punish Governors of Plantations in this Kingdom for crimes by them committed in the Plantations" was an English Act of Parliament passed in the reign of William III of England.

It is the earliest English or British legislation by which Crown servants, including diplomats and governors, could be punished under English law for offences committed abroad. A notable prosecution under the Act was in the case of R v Wall in which Joseph Wall, the former governor of Gorée, was hanged for causing the death of a soldier following an illegal flogging 20 years previously.

The Act was repealed by section 1 of, and Part II of Schedule 1 to, the Statute Law (Repeals) Act 1995.

References

Acts of the Parliament of England
1698 in law
1698 in England